VietinBank Business Center Office Tower is a supertall skyscrapers in the Ciputra urban area. It was planned to be Vietinbank’s headquarters in Hanoi. If built, it will be the second tallest building in Vietnam.

History 
In 2008, Vietinbank agreed to signed a contract with Nam Thang Long Urban Area Development Company Limited. However, because of the 2008 financial crisis, the contract was unsuccessful. So, construction didn’t start until 2010. The skyscraper was expected to be completed in 2014. Unfortunately, the schedule was pushed towards 2018 because of the problems in the company’s investment. In the end, the construction of the building was halted. When it was put on hold, only the basement and a few floors had been finished. After that, the future of the building is uncertain.

See also 

 Keangnam Hanoi Landmark Tower
 Tallest buildings in Vietnam

References

Skyscrapers in Hanoi
Buildings and structures under construction in Vietnam